Stanlake may refer to:

 Billy Stanlake, Australian international cricketer
 William Stanlake, English former military person
 Warren Stanlake, former Australian rules footballer
 Robert Stanlake, former Australian rules footballer
 Claude Stanlake, former Australian rules footballer
 Stanlake J. W. T. Samkange, Zimbabwean former historiographer, educationist, journalist, author
 Stanlake Park Wine Estate, a vineyard in Berkshire, England

See also
 Standlake, a village and civil parish in Oxfordshire, England